The Sayyidah Ruqayyah Mosque is located in Damascus, Syria, and contains the grave of Rukayyah bint Husayn, also known as Ruqayyah, the young daughter of Al-Husayn ibn ‘Alī.

According to Shia Islamic narrations that are commemorated every year on the occasion of Ashura, after enduring the Battle of Karbala and the torturous journey to Damascus that followed it, Sukaynah died at the age of four in Yazid's prison, where her body was originally buried. Years later, however, upon the flooding of her gravesite, her grave was reopened and the body was moved to the site where the Masjid now stands.

The mosque was built around the mausoleum in 1985 and exhibits a modern version of Iranian architecture, with substantial amount of mirror and gold work. There is a small mosque area adjoining the shrine room, along with a small courtyard in front. This mosque is found a short distance from the Umayyad Mosque and the Al-Hamidiyah Souq in central Damascus.

Gallery

See also
Baab Sagheer
Battle of Karbala
Daughters of Husayn ibn Ali
Holiest sites in Islam (Shia)
Jannatul Baqee'
Jannatul Mualla
Sayyidah Zaynab Mosque
Shi'a Islam

References

Shia mosques in Syria
Family of Muhammad
Shia shrines
Architecture in Syria
Islamic holy places
Mausoleums in Syria
Mosques in Damascus
20th-century mosques
Mosques completed in 1985
1985 establishments in Syria